Sublette County School District #9 is a public school district based in Big Piney, Wyoming, United States.

Geography
Sublette County School District #9 serves southwestern Sublette County and                                                                                                     a portion of northeastern Lincoln County, including the following communities:

Incorporated places
Town of Big Piney
Town of La Barge
Town of Marbleton
Census-designated places (Note: All census-designated places are unincorporated.)
Calpet

Schools
Big Piney High School (Grades 9–12)
Big Piney Middle School (Grades 6–8)
Big Piney Elementary School (Grades K-5)
La Barge Elementary School (Grades K-5)

Student demographics
The following figures are as of October 1, 2008.

Total District Enrollment: 691
Student enrollment by gender
Male: 367 (53.11%)
Female: 324 (46.89%)
Student enrollment by ethnicity
White (not Hispanic): 602 (87.12%)
Hispanic: 57 (8.25%)
American Indian or Alaskan Native: 26 (3.76%)
Black (not Hispanic): 6 (0.87%)

See also
List of school districts in Wyoming

References

External links
Sublette County School District #9 – official site.

Education in Sublette County, Wyoming
Education in Lincoln County, Wyoming
School districts in Wyoming